The dwarf sea hare or pygmy sea hare, Aplysia parvula, is a species of sea hare, a marine gastropod mollusc in the family Aplysiidae.

Distribution
Aplysia parvula was long seen as a circumtropical sea hare species, but Golestani et al. (2019) restricted the name A. parvula to the population from tropical waters in the northwest Atlantic, while resurrecting A. elongata, A. japonica, A. atromarginata, and A. nigrocincta for populations from the Indo-Pacific and describing the new species A. ghanimii and A. hooveri for populations from the eastern Pacific. The type locality of Aplysia parvula is Saint Vincent, Lesser Antilles.

Description
The dwarf sea hare is round-bodied and smooth-skinned with a slender head bearing extensions which resemble rabbit ears. There are wing-like flaps (parapodia) extending from the body, which is brown to maroon or olive green in colour and may be covered with clusters of white spots.

The maximum recorded length for this animal is 60 mm.

Ecology
The minimum recorded depth for this species is 0.5 m; maximum recorded depth is 30 m. It usually occurs in less than 5 m of water, but is occasionally found in water as deep as 24 m.

The species is a herbivore, and feeds on different types of algae. Its egg mass is a tangled mass of sticky orange, green or brown strings found under rocks or among algae.

References

 Bebbington A. (1977) Aplysiid species from Eastern Australia with notes on the Pacific Ocean Aplysiomorpha (Gastropoda, Opisthobranchia). Transactions of the Zoological Society of London 34: 87-147.
 Vine, P. (1986). Red Sea Invertebrates. Immel Publishing, London. 224 pp
 Gofas, S.; Le Renard, J.; Bouchet, P. (2001). Mollusca, in: Costello, M.J. et al. (Ed.) (2001). European register of marine species: a check-list of the marine species in Europe and a bibliography of guides to their identification. Collection Patrimoines Naturels, 50: pp. 180–213
  Branch, G.M. et al. (2002). Two Oceans. 5th impression. David Philip, Cate Town & Johannesburg.,
  Burn R. (2006) A checklist and bibliography of the Opisthobranchia (Mollusca: Gastropoda) of Victoria and the Bass Strait area, south-eastern Australia. Museum Victoria Science Reports 10:1–42
 Rosenberg, G., F. Moretzsohn, and E. F. García. 2009. Gastropoda (Mollusca) of the Gulf of Mexico, Pp. 579–699 in Felder, D.L. and D.K. Camp (eds.), Gulf of Mexico–Origins, Waters, and Biota. Biodiversity. Texas A&M Press, College Station, Texas.

Further reading
 Rogers C. N., de Nys R. & Steinberg P. D. (2003). "Ecology of the sea hare Aplysia parvula (Opisthobranchia) in New South Wales, Australia". Molluscan Research 23(3): 185-198. , PDF.

Aplysia
Gastropods described in 1863